Broad Campden is a small village in Gloucestershire, England, with a church and pub, and notable for its beauty and fine walking trails.

History
The village is the site of the listed partly 12th century Norman Chapel House that was renovated by C. R. Ashbee for the art historian Ananda Coomaraswamy and his wife, the hand weaver, Ethel (later Ethel Mairet) from 1905 to 1907. It was the home of the Arts & Crafts Essex House Press from 1907 and Ashbee lived there from 1911.

Population
In the 18th century there were 54 houses and just over 250 inhabitants; by 1971 there were over seventy houses but only 137 inhabitants.

References

Villages in Gloucestershire
Chipping Campden